Father Berard Haile (1874–1961), O.F.M., was a Franciscan priest and one of the foremost authorities on Navajo anthropology. He entered the Franciscan Order in 1891 and was ordained a priest on June 29, 1898. He served at St. Michael's Mission, a Franciscan mission to the Navajo at St. Michaels, Arizona, and at other missions in the Southwest, from 1901 to 1954, where he developed an interest in Navajo language and culture.  He helped devise a written alphabet of the Navajo language and published a four volume work on learning Navajo. In 1929 Haile attended the Catholic University of America and obtained a master's degree.  He then accepted the position of Research Associate in Anthropology at the University of Chicago. He made a field trip with Edward Sapir through Navajo land that was sponsored by the Laboratory of Anthropology at Santa Fe, New Mexico.  Haile devised a new Navajo alphabet containing over sixty characters.  His other major work dealt with the creation story of the Navajo, Diné Bahaneʼ.

Haile was awarded a Doctor of Letters degree from St. Bonaventure University in 1951, and a Doctor of Laws degree in 1952 from the University of New Mexico. In 1953 the Navajo Tribal Council passed a resolution which read in part: "Father Berard Haile has spent his life among the Navajo people learning to know and understand us and our religion, and has, more than any other living non-Indian, through close contact with Navajos and the medicine men of our tribe and by his indefatigable labor, reduced our language to written form and succeeded in preserving for future generations the knowledge of the Navajo history and religion."

References 

American Friars Minor
Linguists from the United States
American anthropologists
Anthropological linguists
Catholic University of America alumni
University of Chicago staff
1874 births
1961 deaths
Linguists of Navajo